Steve Broderick (born January 1, 1981) is an American vocalist who was a member of the Trans-Siberian Orchestra from 2000 to 2009.

Broderick was a backup singer in the band's 2009 album, Night Castle, and the band's 2015 album, Letters from the Labyrinth.

External links
TSO homepage 
Homepage

Trans-Siberian Orchestra members
Living people
1981 births
21st-century American male singers
21st-century American singers